Thomas Allen Burke (born October 12, 1976) is a former American college and professional football player who was a defensive end in the National Football League (NFL) for four seasons.  He played college football at University of Wisconsin and earned All-American honors. During the 1997-98 season, Burke led all college football with 22 sacks and 31 total tackles for loss while helping Wisconsin to a Rose Bowl victory and #5 overall ranking.  He was chosen 83rd overall in the 3rd round of the 1999 draft NFL draft by the Arizona Cardinals and played all four years of his NFL career with Arizona.

Early years
Burke was born in Poplar, Wisconsin.  He attended Northwestern High School in nearby Maple, Wisconsin, and played for the Northwestern Tigers high school football team, of the Wisconsin Interscholastic Athletic Association (WIAA), Heart O' North Conference.

College career
Burke attended the University of Wisconsin in Madison, and played for the Wisconsin Badgers football team from 1995 to 1998.  As a senior in 1998, he was recognized as a consensus first-team All-American, Big Ten Defensive Player of the Year, first-team All-Big Ten, and received the Bill Willis Trophy.  He holds the Big Ten record for most sacks in a single season with 22.

Professional career
In four NFL seasons, he appeared in 36 games, started 12, and accumulated 49 tackles and 4.5 sacks.

Arrest
On June 15, 2021, Burke was arrested in Wisconsin for allegedly sexually assaulting a seven year old girl in St. Louis County, Minnesota. The report states he performed oral sex on the child on several occasions.

References

1976 births
Living people
All-American college football players
American football defensive ends
Arizona Cardinals players
People from Douglas County, Wisconsin
Players of American football from Wisconsin
Wisconsin Badgers football players